Ağaçören, formerly Panlı, is a town in Aksaray Province in the Central Anatolia region of Turkey. It is the seat of Ağaçören District. Its population is 2,878 (2021). The town consists of the quarters Camili, Gümüştepe, Kale, Yeni, Yurtsever and Zafer.

References

External links
 Aksaray governor's office 
 

Towns in Turkey
Populated places in Aksaray Province
Ağaçören District